Aalma ech Chaab (علما الشعب) is a village in the Tyre District, in Southern Lebanon.

Name
According to E. H. Palmer, ’Alma means "a coat of mail"; while  Shảub means "mountain spurs".
According to Dr. Anis Freyha in his book " A Dictionary of the Names of Towns and Villages in Lebanon" 2nd edition 1985, page 117, he mentions that the root of the name is Semitic (עלם) and could mean "the hidden" or sexual maturity, the same in Phoenicians and Aramaic.

History
In 1875, during the late Ottoman era, Victor Guérin found here a village with 350 inhabitants, mostly Greek Orthodox, or  Maronite.

In 1881, the PEF's Survey of Western Palestine (SWP) described it: “A large Christian village, containing about 500 inhabitants. The houses are clean and well built. There are two chapels, and the place seems increasing in size. It is situated on a ridge, with figs, olives, and pomegranates and arable land around. 
To the east and north the land is covered with brushwood. There is a spring within reach, and about thirty rock-cut cisterns in the village.”

Modern era
In 2009, there were 400 members of the Saint-Élie  parish of the Melkite Church in the village.

References

Bibliography

External links
Aalma ech Chaab,  Localiban
Survey of Western Palestine, Map 3:  IAA, Wikimedia commons

Populated places in the Israeli security zone 1985–2000
Populated places in Tyre District